Eleutherius served as Greek Patriarch of Alexandria between 1175 and 1180.

References
 

12th-century Patriarchs of Alexandria